"The Cowboy Rides Away" is a song written by Sonny Throckmorton and Casey Kelly, and recorded by American country music artist George Strait.  It was released in January 1985 as the second single from his album Does Fort Worth Ever Cross Your Mind.  It peaked at number 5 on the United States Billboard Hot Country Singles chart, and at number 3 on the RPM Country Tracks chart in Canada. It is the song used by Strait to close out his performances. This is also the name of his last and final tour commencing January 18, 2013.

It was the last song he sang at his final The Cowboy Rides Away Tour concert on June 7, 2014 at AT&T Stadium in Arlington, Texas with a worldwide record setting attendance for the show at 104,000.

Content
The song is about a cowboy riding away from a failed relationship. He and his wife/girlfriend have been through it all and they just can’t work things out.

Critical reception
Kevin John Coyne of Country Universe gave the song an A grade, calling it a song that "embraces the traditional cowboy mythos while simultaneously reinventing it."

Chart positions

Certifications

References

Songs about cowboys and cowgirls
1985 singles
George Strait songs
Songs written by Casey Kelly (songwriter)
Songs written by Sonny Throckmorton
Song recordings produced by Jimmy Bowen
MCA Records singles
1984 songs